Sir Robert Stevenson Aitken (16 April 1901 – 10 April 1997) was a physician and university administrator from New Zealand. He was vice-chancellor of the University of Otago in New Zealand between 1948 and 1953 and of the University of Birmingham between 1953 and 1968.

Born in Wyndham on 16 April 1901, Aitken was educated at Mosgiel District High School and Gisborne High School. He went on to study medicine at the University of Otago, graduating MB ChB in 1922. He played representative field hockey for Otago in 1921 and 1922. In 1924, he was awarded a Rhodes Scholarship, and went to study at Balliol College, Oxford, where he completed a DPhil in 1926. In 1929, Aitken married Margaret Kane, and the couple had three children.

In 1953, Aitken was awarded the Queen Elizabeth II Coronation Medal. He was appointed a Knight Bachelor in the 1960 Queen's Birthday Honours.

References

Academics of the University of Birmingham
Vice-Chancellors of the University of Otago
1901 births
1997 deaths
Vice-Chancellors of the University of Birmingham
Knights Bachelor
People from Wyndham, New Zealand
People educated at Taieri College
People educated at Gisborne Boys' High School
University of Otago alumni
Alumni of Balliol College, Oxford
New Zealand Rhodes Scholars